This list of islands in Ponce, Puerto Rico, is a summary of the seven islands that form part of the municipality of Ponce, Puerto Rico. It consists of islands, keys, and cays, and similarly named geographic features surrounded by large bodies of water, namely, the Caribbean Sea.

Island list summary table

Gallery

References

External links

History of Puerto Rico
Islands of Ponce, Puerto Rico
.
Islands, Ponce
islands